Lubna Rehan (born 2 July 1979) is a Pakistani politician who was a Member of the Provincial Assembly of the Punjab, from May 2013 to May 2018.

Early life and education
She was born on 2 July 1979 in Lahore.

She graduated in 2001 from the University of the Punjab and received a degree of Bachelor of Arts. She earned the degree of Bachelor of Education in 2007 from Allama Iqbal Open University.

Political career

She was elected to the Provincial Assembly of the Punjab as a candidate of Pakistan Muslim League (N) on a reserved seat for women in 2013 Pakistani general election.

References

Living people
Punjab MPAs 2013–2018
Women members of the Provincial Assembly of the Punjab
1979 births
Pakistan Muslim League (N) politicians
21st-century Pakistani women politicians